The Quiet Resistance is the third studio album by the Dutch gothic metal band Nemesea, released in 2011. The album was produced and mixed by Joost van den Broek.

Track listing

Singles
A music video was made for the song Afterlife.  The video was released on November 4, 2011.

Personnel
Nemesea
 Manda Ophuis - vocals
 Hendrik Jan 'HJ' de Jong - guitars
 Lasse Dellbrügge - keyboards
 Sonny Onderwater - bass
 Frank van der Star - drums
Guest musicians
 Joost van den Broek - additional piano on tracks 5 and 9
 Gerben Verhaar - guest vocals on track 1
 Charlotte Wessels - guest vocals on track 6
 Matt Litwin (BulletProof Messenger) - turntables & strings on track 8
 Marcus Klavan (BulletProof Messenger) - vocals on track 8
 Heli Reißenweber (Maerzfeld) - guest vocals on track 14

References

External links
 Album info on the official Nemesea website

2011 albums
Nemesea albums
Napalm Records albums